This list contains the names of albums that contain a hidden track and also information on how to find them. Not all printings of an album contain the same track arrangements, so some copies of a particular album may not have the hidden track(s) listed below. Some of these tracks may be hidden in the pregap, and some hidden simply as a track following the listed tracks. The list is ordered by artist name using the surname where appropriate.

 Aqua Teen Hunger Force Colon Movie Film For Theaters soundtrack: Contains a song performed by Dana Snyder at the end of "Nude Love (Reprise)."
 The Beavis and Butt-Head Experience: following a period of silence after the album's final track is a reprise of the third track, "Come to Butt-Head" by Beavis and Butt-Head (Mike Judge); it repeats the original track's first verse, then continues with new lyrics where the two are joined by rapper Positive K
 Chicago Hope soundtrack: The album lists 24 tracks, but actually has 26 with cast member Mandy Patinkin performing "And the Band Played On" (as track 4) and "Political Science" (track 23).
 Darkthrone Holy Darkthrone: Tracks "Slottet i det fjerne" and "To Walk the Infernal Fields" are listed as unique tracks on the back cover, but they are a single track on a CD with few minutes of silence between them.
 Digimon: The Movie soundtrack: At tracks 13, 14, 15, 16 and 17, the Digimon Theme, Change Into Power, Let's Kick It Up, Going Digital and Strange starts playing after Here We Go and 59 seconds of silence.
 Enjoy Every Sandwich: Songs of Warren Zevon: after a period of silence, Jorge Calderón and Jennifer Warnes' version of Zevon's "Keep Me in Your Heart" - an instrumental version of the same song, arranged by Van Dyke Parks, plays after the last track.
 Kill Bill Volume 2 soundtrack: Hidden track "Black Mamba" by The Wu-Tang Clan plays at the end of "Urami Bushi."
 Knights of the Blues Table: A rare track of Cyril Davies performing KC Moan is 'hidden' in the pregap. Instructions to access the track are in the liner notes.
 Leader of the Starry Skies – A Loyal Companion: 30 seconds following Idiot Box's cover of "Nurses Whispering Versus", Sarah Cutts' "The Barnacle Tree" - the only original composition of the compilation - begins to play. iTunes copies also include three extra unlisted cover tracks upon downloading - Local Girls' cover of "Odd Even", Ham Legion's cover of "Dead Mouse" and Stephen EvEns' cover of "The Duck and Roger the Horse".
 Lost in Translation soundtrack: Nine minutes after "Just Like Honey," Bob Harris's version of " More Than This" by Roxy Music
 Mamma Mia! The Movie Soundtrack: "Thank You for the Music" by Amanda Seyfried
 Mojo presents... Let It Be Revisited: This tribute album to The Beatles' final album Let It Be was released as a free CD in August 2010 in the Mojo magazine. A vinyl version was released shortly after in the same magazine. The CD version of the album splits Beth Orton's "I Me Mine/Dig It" into two songs, "I Me Mine" and "Dig It," although this is not credited on the cover. The vinyl version splits "Let It Be" into two, although there is mention of this.
 Napoleon Dynamite soundtrack: After a period of silence, Kip's love song to Lafawnduh plays.
 Now That's What I Call Music 7 (UK series): The song "A Kind of Magic" by Queen plays shortly after Side 3 (Record 2 Side 1) or (Cassette 2 Side 1). The song was listed as a bonus track on some copies, however, through a sticker placed on the front cover.Was not a hidden track on the CD re-issue at all as it was listed on the tracklisting.
 Perfect Dark soundtrack: a sound clip of Joanna saying "Switch this thing off!" following a period of silence on the second disc
 The Powerpuff Girls Heroes & Villains: Track entitled "Love Makes the World Go Round" after a period of silence following the last song "The Powerpuff Girls (End Theme)"
 Resident Evil soundtrack: untitled track after about a minute and a half of silence, a sound clip from the movie is played.
 The Rugrats Movie soundtrack: At track 13, Take Me There (Want U Back Mix) starts playing.
 Relax! The Ultimate 80's Mix: In between all the songs on the album is brief pregaps containing fragments of music (as the album is a consecutive DJ Mix, these pregaps segue in from previous tracks and into the last)
 Shaun of the Dead soundtrack: "Fun Dead (Osymyso remix)"
 Six Feet Under, Vol. 2: Everything Ends soundtrack: contains Imogen Heap's one-minute lullaby version of "I'm A Lonely Little Petunia (in an Onion Patch)" after Arcade Fire's "Cold Wind."
 Songs in the Key of X (soundtrack from The X-Files): contains two hidden tracks before track 1: "Time Jesum Transeuntum Et Non Riverentum (Dread the Passage of Jesus, For He Will Not Return)" by Nick Cave and the Dirty Three, and a version of The X-Files theme by the Dirty Three
 Steal This Disc 2: "Theme From Rocky & Bullwinkle" has a spoken introduction with negative timing. The introduction plays only if the track is played immediately after the preceding track on the CD.
 This Is... Cult Fiction Royale: This 1997 compilation album of cult television series theme tunes released by Virgin Records and EMI features a hidden track at the end of disc two – the jingle from the Associated Television (ATV) "Zoom 2" ident that had featured on ATV in the 1960s and 1970s.
 The Triplets of Belleville soundtrack: Has a sound clip at the end of the English version of the theme song at 5:13. The clip is of Grandma playing the piano very poorly while singing in Portuguese.
 We're a Happy Family: "Today Your Love, Tomorrow the World" by John Frusciante after a period of silence
 Wipeout 2097 (1996 game): The PlayStation, Sega Saturn and Windows discs can be played in CD players, after track 1 which contains the game data
 The X-Files: The Album: contains a spoken word track at 10:13 (homage to Ten Thirteen) of Chris Carter explaining the show's conspiracy
 Yu-Gi-Oh! The Movie Soundtrack: At track 13, the Yu-Gi-Oh! Theme starts playing.
 Various compilation releases, released in the UK newspaper The Independent, feature hidden tracks after the final track. Many of the albums feature more than one track (for example, one track on one album, combined with all the hidden tracks, has a length of 56 minutes 40 seconds).

See also
 List of backmasked messages
 List of albums with tracks hidden in the pregap

References 

Various